Route 62 is an  east–west state route in Massachusetts. The route crosses four of the Bay State's 13 interstates (I-190, I-495, I-93, and I-95), as well as U.S. Route 1 (US 1), US 3, Route 2 and Highway 128 as it heads from the northern hills of Worcester County through the northern portions of Greater Boston, ending in the North Shore city of Beverly at Route 127.

Route description
Route 62 begins in Barre, in the north central hills of Worcester County, at Routes 32 and 122, at the town's commons and center. It  heads northeastward into the town of Hubbardston, intersecting Route 68 before heading into Princeton. In Princeton, Route 62 has a short concurrency with Route 31. It then crosses into Sterling, intersecting with Route 140 and passing underneath Interstate 190 without interchange, before passing through the town's center concurrently with Route 12.

From Sterling, Route 62 passes through the southern end of the town of Lancaster before entering Clinton.  In Clinton, it is concurrent with Route 70 for most of the town, with a short section being triply concurrent with Route 110.  Routes 62 and 70 pass through the center of town and pass the dam on the Nashua River which creates the Wachusett Reservoir before Route 62 heads eastward again, splitting with Route 70 at the Boylston town line.  After crossing through the town of Berlin, it has an interchange with Interstate 495 at Exit 67 (formerly 26) before crossing into Middlesex County and the town of Hudson.

In Hudson, Route 62 has a junction and short concurrency with Route 85 as it heads eastward, crossing the Assabet River before entering northward into the town of Stow.  At the center of Stow, Route 62 turns eastward again, becoming concurrent with Route 117 for two miles into the town of Maynard.  In Maynard, the route crosses the Assabet River twice more, the second time concurrently with Route 27.  Following the path of the Assabet, it then passes through the  southern corner of Acton before heading into Concord.  In Concord, Route 62 joins the town's Main Street, passing the West Concord Depot, a commuter rail stop along the Fitchburg Line.  As Main Street, Route 62 intersects Route 2and crosses the Sudbury River before leaving that road at Concord's town common, just south of the site of the Battle of Concord.

Route 62 continues northeastward into Bedford, where it shares a three-way concurrency with Routes 4 and 225, passing the historic Fitch Tavern before splitting from those roads. It then has a junction with U. S. Highway 3at Exit 73 (formerly 26) before entering Burlington. It crosses the old Middlesex Turnpike before arcing northward to meet Route 3A just south of the Billerica town line. It becomes concurrent with Route 3A southward for half a mile before turning northward, heading into the town of Wilmington. In Wilmington it crosses Routes 38 and 129 just south of the Wilmington Station along the Lowell Line of the MBTA Commuter Rail line. It then has a junction with Interstate 93 at Exit 34 (formerly 40) just east of Route 62's intersection with the southern end of Route 125. After crossing I-93, Route 62 heads eastward into North Reading. It shares a quarter-mile long concurrency with Route 28 before continuing eastward  into Essex County and the town of Middleton.

In Middleton, Route 62 heads north one final time, sharing a short wrong-way concurrency with Route 114 before turning eastward, crossing the Ipswich River before finally turning southeastward into the town of Danvers.  In Danvers, the route has consecutive interchanges with U.S. Route 1 (along the Newburyport Turnpike) and I-95, just north of the former Danvers State Hospital site.  It continues eastward, crossing Route 35 and Highway 128 (at Exit 43, formerly exit 22) before entering Beverly.  In Beverly, Route 62 crosses Routes 1A and 22 before finally ending at Route 127, just a tenth of a mile north of Mackerel Cove, Beverly Harbor and Massachusetts Bay.

Major intersections

References

"Massachusetts Atlas and Gazetteer."  Yarmouth, Maine: DeLorme.  First Edition, 1998.
The Roads of Massachusetts

062
Transportation in Essex County, Massachusetts
Transportation in Middlesex County, Massachusetts
Transportation in Worcester County, Massachusetts